Garfield merchandise is merchandise based on the “Garfield” comic strip by Jim Davis. Garfield is one of the world's most profitable and widely syndicated comic strips, and was specifically designed to be marketable. Before the sale of Paws, Inc. in August 2019, all the profits from merchandise went to Paws, Inc., of which Jim Davis is the CEO and founder.The following is a compiled list of selected merchandise based on the franchise.

Books

Compilations
Since 1980, Ballantine Books has published compilations containing reprints of Garfield comic strips as they appeared in newspapers. These books were originally printed in black and white, but Volumes 37 and later, as well as reissues of earlier volumes, have been in full color. Each book collects approximately six months of comics, including the Sunday comics (which were in black and white prior to Volume 37).

The titles of these books were styled as double entendre alluding to Garfield's weight (Note: an extra at the end of a Garfield compilation advertised "rejected book titles"). These books introduced the "Garfield format" in publishing, whereby the rectangular books are horizontally oriented to match the comic strip dimensions; Davis has recalled having to invent the format to better fit the books on the store shelves. Volumes 37 and later introduced a new, larger square book in full color, showing the Sunday strips to be formatted in a size as they usually are, instead of shrunken-down to meet the book size. However, this means that the first panel after the logo box (called the drop panel, or throwaway gag, because newspapers can drop it without ruining the point of the strip) is no longer printed in the compilation books. These panels, however, are preserved on the eBook editions.

Each of the original 36 books have been re-released in the new larger format, dubbed "Garfield Classics".

Garfield Classics
The Garfield Classics imprint has been in print since 2001, and reprints Garfield's first 36 books in a "remastered" format, with increased page size, bolder lines, and each strip in full-color format.

Garfield Complete Works
Garfield Complete Works is a hardcover collection of Garfield strips, with both black and white (daily) and full-color (Sunday) comics. The first volume includes archival material and an introduction from Garfield creator Jim Davis.

In the UK, over 60 Garfield books, mainly "Pocket Books" or paperbacks, have been published by Ravette. The format is slightly different, as the strips are presented in a vertical style. In the Garfield 20th anniversary book, however, Davis said vertical stacking was the one type of comic anthology layout he wanted to avoid the most when compiling the above collections.

Additionally, adaptations of Garfield television specials have been published in comic format:

 Garfield as Himself (1997) contains the following books:
Here Comes Garfield (1982)
 Garfield on the Town (1983)
 Garfield Gets a Life (1991)
 Garfield Holiday Celebrations (1997) contains the following books:
Garfield in Disguise (Halloween special) (1985)
 Garfield's Thanksgiving (1988)
 A Garfield Christmas (1987)
 Garfield Travel Adventures (1998) contains the following books:
Garfield in the Rough (1984)
 Garfield in Paradise (1986)
 Garfield Goes Hollywood (1987)

Garfield Fat Cat Three Pack
Each Fat Cat volume contains the contents of three successive compilations stacked back-to-back.

There are two types of Fat Cat books, one featuring black and white strips and one featuring full color strips.

Volumes 1 to 12 have been released in black and white, but most have since been reissued in full color.

The black and white strips were published semi-annually up to Vol. 11 (compilations 31–33) in 1999. Since then, the publication schedule has slowed: Vol. 12 (compilations 34–36) was published in 2001, followed by Vol. 13 (compilations 37–39) in 2006.

Black and white strips

 Vol. 1 (1,2,3) was released on March 16, 1993.
 Vol. 2 (4,5,6) was released on August 9, 1994. 
 Vol. 3 (7,8,9) was released on January 30, 1995. 
 Vol. 4 (10,11,12) was released on August 15, 1995. 
 Vol. 5 (13,14,15) was released on January 30, 1996. 
 Vol. 6 (16,17,18) was released on September 3, 1996. 
 Vol. 7 (19,20,21) was released on April 7, 1997. 
 Vol. 8 (22,23,24) was released on January 20, 1998. 
 Vol. 9 (25,26,27) was released on August 25, 1998. 
 Vol. 10 (28,29,30) was released on February 2, 1999. 
 Vol. 11 (31,32,33) was released on September 7, 1999. 
 Vol. 12 (34,35,36) was released on April 3, 2001.

Color strips

The first twelve Fat Cat volumes have been reissued in larger, colorized versions. Starting from Fat Cat Vol. 13 (2006), the larger, full-color format of the reissued volumes has also been used.

 Vol. 1 (1,2,3) was released on August 26, 2003. 
 Vol. 2 (4,5,6) was released on August 30, 2005. 
 Vol. 3 (7,8,9) was released on September 25, 2007. 
 Vol. 4 (10,11,12) was released on March 24, 2009. 
 Vol. 5 (13,14,15) was released on October 26, 2010. 
 Vol. 6 (16,17,18) was released on March 22, 2011. 
 Vol. 7 (19,20,21) was released on April 24, 2012. 
 Vol. 8 (22,23,24) was released on March 4, 2014. 
 Vol. 9 (25,26,27) was released on April 28, 2015. 
 Vol. 10 (28,29,30) was released on November 25, 2016. 
 Vol. 11 (31,32,33) was released on November 14, 2017. 
 Vol. 12 (34,35,36) was released on March 19, 2019. 
 Vol. 13 (37,38,39) was released on August 29, 2006. 
 Vol. 14 (40,41,42) was released on October 27, 2009. 
 Vol. 15 (43,44,45) was released on October 25, 2011. 
 Vol. 16 (46,47,48) was released on February 12, 2013. 
 Vol. 17 (49,50,51) was released on October 28, 2014. 
 Vol. 18 (52,53,54) was released on June 7, 2016. 
 Vol. 19 (55,56,57) was released on March 14, 2017. 
 Vol. 20 (58,59,60) was released on March 13, 2018. 
 Vol. 21 (61,62,63) was released on July 16, 2019. 
 Vol. 22 (64,65,66) was released on October 6, 2020.
 Vol. 23 (67,68,69) was released on May 4, 2021.
 Vol. 24 (70,71,72) was released on December 6, 2022.

Treasury

10 Garfield Treasury compilations have been released featuring the Sunday strips in the large color format.

Garfield Treasury was released on June 12, 1984. Features comic strips from: June 25, 1978 to July 13, 1980
The Second Garfield Treasury
The Third Garfield Treasury was released on October 12, 1985
The Fourth Garfield Treasury
The Fifth Garfield Treasury
The Sixth Garfield Treasury
The Seventh Garfield Treasury was released on October 19, 1993. Features comic strips from: February 3, 1991 to March 7, 1993
The Eighth Garfield Treasury was released on October 31, 1995. Features comic strips from: March 14, 1993 to April 16, 1995
The Ninth Garfield Treasury was released on November 11, 1997. Features comic strips from: April 23, 1995 to May 25, 1997
The Tenth Garfield Treasury was released on October 5, 1999. Features comic strips from: May 25, 1997 to July 25, 1999

Others
 Garfield: His 9 Lives (1984), graphic novel, later made into a TV special.
 Garfield: Big Fat Book of Jokes and Riddles (1985)
 The Unabridged Uncensored Unbelievable Garfield (1986)
Garfield Book of Cat Names (1988)
Garfield How to Party Book (1988)
Garfield Crazy About Numbers (1988) – (sticker book)
Give Me Coffee and No One Gets Hurt (discontinued)
Garfield the Easter Bunny? (1989)
Garfield and the Santa Spy (1989)
Garfield's Judgment Day (1990)
Garfield: The Me Book (1990) (motivational handbook)
Garfield and the Truth About Cats (1991)
Garfield's Insults, Put-Downs & Slams (1994)
Garfield Discovers America (1994)
Garfield Jolly Holiday 3-pack (1997) – Renamed to Garfield Holiday Celebrations in (2004)
Garfield's Book of Jokes and Riddles (1997)
The Garfield Game Book (1998)
20 Years & Still Kicking!: Garfield's Twentieth Anniversary Collection (1998)
Garfield's Big Book of Excellent Excuses (2000)
Garfield: The Gruesome Twosome 2 in 1 Book (2002)
I'm in the Mood for Food: In the Kitchen with Garfield (2003)
Garfield at 25: In Dogs Years I'd Be Dead (2003)
How to Draw Garfield and the Gang (2004)
Garfield's Guide to Everything (2004)
Odie Unleashed: Garfield Lets the Dog Out Book (2005)
The Garfield Journal (2005)
Lights, Camera, Hairballs: Garfield at the Movies (2006)
30 Years of Laughs & Lasagna (2008)
Garfield Minus Garfield (2008)
Garfield from the Trash Bin: Rescued Rejects & Outrageous Outtakes (2010)
Garfield Left Speechless (2012)
My Laughable Life with Garfield: The Jon Arbuckle Chronicles (2012), a collection of various comic strips throughout the years)
Age Happens: Garfield Hits the Big 4-0 (2018), a collection of Garfield's birthday strips since 1978; foreword by Lin-Manuel Miranda
Early-reader adventure novels featuring Garfield
Garfield's Night Before Christmas (1988)
Garfield's Furry Tales (1989)
Garfield and the Haunted Diner (1990)
Garfield Goes Camping (1991)
Garfield's Haunted House and Other Spooky Tales (1994)
Garfield's Stupid Cupid and Other Stories (1995)
Garfield Goes to Disobedience School (1997)
Garfield's Christmas Tales (1994)
Garfield's Ghost Stories (1990)
Garfield and the Beast in the Basement (2002)
Garfield and the Mysterious Mummy (1997)
Garfield and the Teacher Creature (1998)
Garfield and the Wicked Wizard (2002)

Garfield's Pet Force, series of early-reader novels:
#1: The Outrageous Origin (1997)
#2: Pie Rat's Revenge (1998)
#3: K-Niner: Dog of Doom (1998)
#4: Menace of the Mutanator (1999)
#5: Attack of the Lethal Lizards (1999)

Garfield Extreme, a series of children's picture books.
Garfield's Extreme Cuisine: Pigging the Way Out! (2003)
Garfield's Ironcat (2003)
Garfield's Awesome Ski Adventure (2002)
Garfield's Sumo Beach Bellyball (2002)

Home video releases

VHS 
Here Comes Garfield (August 6, 1992)
Garfield on the Town (August 6, 1992)
Garfield in the Rough (August 6, 1992)
Garfield in Paradise (August 6, 1992)
Garfield Goes Hollywood (August 6, 1992)
Garfield's Thanksgiving (October 8, 1992)
Garfield: His 9 Lives (March 3, 1993)
Garfield's Halloween Adventure (October 20, 1993)
Garfield's Babes and Bullets (January 26, 1994)
A Garfield Christmas (October 1, 1996)
Garfield's Feline Fantasies (July 29, 1997)
Garfield Gets a Life (January 1, 2002)
Garfield: The Movie (October 19, 2004)

DVD 
Garfield As Himself (June 29, 2004)
Garfield and Friends: Volume One (July 27, 2004)
Garfield: The Movie (October 19, 2004)
Garfield Holiday Celebrations (October 26, 2004)
Garfield and Friends: Volume Two (December 7, 2004)
Garfield Travel Adventures (February 15, 2005)
Garfield and Friends: Volume Three (April 19, 2005)
Garfield Fantasies (May 24, 2005)
Garfield and Friends: Volume Four (August 30, 2005)
Garfield and Friends: Volume Five (December 6, 2005)
Garfield: A Tail of Two Kitties (October 10, 2006)
Garfield and Friends: Behind the Scenes (December 5, 2006)
Garfield and Friends: An Ode to Odie (March 20, 2007)
Garfield and Friends: Dreams & Schemes (September 4, 2007)
Garfield Gets Real (November 20, 2007)
Garfield and Friends: A Cat and His Nerd (May 13, 2008)
Garfield's Fun Fest (August 5, 2008)
Garfield's Pet Force (June 16, 2009)
The Garfield Show: Odie Oh! (October 5, 2010)
The Garfield Show: All You Need is Love (and Pasta) (January 4, 2011)
The Garfield Show: Private-Eye Ventures (April 12, 2011)
The Garfield Show: Spooky Tails (August 23, 2011)
The Garfield Show: Dinosaurs & Other Animal Adventures (January 10, 2012)
The Garfield Show: Summer Adventures (May 29, 2012)
The Garfield Show: Holiday Extravaganza (September 4, 2012)
The Garfield Show: Spring Fun Collection (February 19, 2013)
The Garfield Show: Pizza Dreams (June 25, 2013)
The Garfield Show: A Purr-Fect Life! (October 22, 2013)
The Garfield Show: It’s Showtime (February 18, 2014)
The Garfield Show: Best Friends Forever (July 29, 2014)
The Garfield Show: Techno Cat (November 4, 2014)
Garfield Holiday Collection (November 4, 2014)
Happy Holidays, Garfield! (September 12, 2017)
Garfield: Nine Lives (February 13, 2018)
Garfield: 20 Garfield Stories (June 12, 2018)
Garfield’s Halloween Adventure (August 28, 2018)
Garfield and Friends: Season 1 (July 16, 2019)
Garfield and Friends: Season 2 (November 5, 2019)
Garfield and Friends: Season 3 (October 27, 2020)
Garfield and Friends: The Grumpy Cat Collection (June 15, 2021)

Blu-Ray 
Garfield: The Movie (October 11, 2011)
Garfield: A Tail of Two Kitties (October 11, 2011)

Television

Specials

 Here Comes Garfield (October 25, 1982)
 Garfield on the Town (October 28, 1983)
 Garfield in the Rough (October 26, 1984)
 Garfield's Halloween Adventure (October 30, 1985)
 Garfield in Paradise (May 27, 1986)
 Garfield Goes Hollywood (May 8, 1987)
 A Garfield Christmas (December 21, 1987)
 Happy Birthday, Garfield (May 17, 1988)
 Garfield: His 9 Lives (November 22, 1988)
 Garfield's Babes and Bullets (May 23, 1989)
 Garfield's Thanksgiving (November 22, 1989)
 Garfield's Feline Fantasies (May 18, 1990)
 Garfield Gets a Life (May 8, 1991)

Animated series
 Garfield and Friends (1988–1994)
 The Garfield Show (2009–2016)
 Garfield Originals (2019–2020)
 Untitled Garfield Nickelodeon series (TBA)

Video games
Garfield has also been featured in video games. The first one was an unreleased Atari 2600 prototype in 1984. There was later an 8-bit Famicom game of Garfield made in Japan in 1989. A Garfield game was also under development for the Atari 5200, but the game was cancelled when Atari was taken over by Jack Tramiel.

Films
 Theatrical films
 Garfield: The Movie (2004) — Breckin Meyer, Jennifer Love Hewitt, and Bill Murray as the voice of Garfield.
 Garfield: A Tail of Two Kitties (2006) — Breckin Meyer, Jennifer Love Hewitt, and Bill Murray as the voice of Garfield.
 Untitled Garfield animated film (2024) — Samuel L. Jackson, and Chris Pratt as the voice of Garfield.
 Direct-to-video films
 Garfield Gets Real (2007)
 Garfield's Fun Fest (2008)
 Garfield's Pet Force (2009)

Crew

Figurines and toys
Danbury Mint has made numerous products for Garfield collectors. Two (Bedtime for Garfield and Bedtime for Odie) are plushes, and all but seven have Garfield with another character.
Small Figurines (no larger than 4" × 4" × 4"): Catnap, Crowning Achievement, Easy Rider, Here's Lookin' at Me, Gourmet Picnic, Love in Bloom, King of the Jungle, Open House, Midnight Serenade, On Vacation, Return to Sender, Sittin' Pretty
Musicals (10" wood base with figurine atop): Anchors Aweigh, La Cucaracha, Sittin' on the Dock of the Bay; Oh, What a Beautiful Morning
Garfield's Christmas Village (11 pieces in all, including): Garfield's House, Post Office, Movies, Toy Shoppe, Candy Store, Courthouse, Church, Bakery, and more.
Large Figurines: Garfield's Retreat, Garfield's Poolside Resort, Garfield's Golf Course, Garfield's Garden
Other: Garfield's Carousel and Garfield's Christmas Train
Plush (2' tall): Bedtime for Garfield and Bedtime for Odie
Diecast Vehicles: Both Ertl and Esci have made a range of diecast toys featuring Garfield driving various vehicles

Miscellaneous
 In 1991, GRP records released a Garfield-themed compilation album titled Am I Cool or What?
 Suction-cupped plush toys of Garfield, known as "Stuck on You", were a phenomenon across America and it took several years for production to meet the demand.
 A line of plush products and other toy replicas were licensed for production by the Dakin Company in the 1980s.
 Garfield was featured in a 1988 advertising campaign for Maple Leaf Village Amusement Park.
 In 2000 Garfield was used as a mascot/recruiting tool for Cub Scouting, appearing on many items, including 4 plush Garfield's in Cub Scout uniforms.
 Garfield and Odie were previously featured on product packaging for the retail chain Meijer.
 Baby Garfield is featured on Sam's Club brand diapers.
 At Kennywood, an amusement park located near Pittsburgh, Garfield was one of the mascots. From 2004 to 2020, the park housed a dark ride titled Garfield's Nightmare. A Garfield themed free-fall ride for children titled the "Pounce Bounce" was in operation. Lake Compounce, also ran and owned by Kennywood's owners, used Garfield theming as well.
Silverwood Theme Park, the Northwests largest theme park near Coeur d'Alene Idaho, had Garfield as the official mascot.
When Microsoft released the Windows 98 edition of Microsoft Plus!, they included in it many brand new desktop themes, some of which were based on popular comics. Garfield was one of them.
Tyco released a novelty Garfield Telephone in 1978. They became the center of many news reports after they continuously washed up on a French beach over a 35-year period.

Promotions
Garfield has been used in multiple promotional campaigns. In 1987, the character was used in a promotion for the fast food restaurant McDonald's. In the promotion, McDonald's sold 4 Happy Meal toys, 4 collectible glasses, and a limited edition stuffed Garfield employee. In 2019, it was found that the paint on these mugs contained a high amount of lead which exceeded the current legal amount on an item intended to be used by children, in addition to high levels of cadmium. Garfield was also used in promotions for the Yum! Brands properties KFC and Taco Bell. In 2000, he was used in a Kid's Meal promotion for Wendy's Old Fashioned Hamburgers, where 6 toys were sold. He was used many promotions for his film, including 3 Goldfish figures, and 5 Wendy's toys, including a card game, magnet doll, wind up toy, play clock, and a pair of sunglasses. He was also featured in a successful Dairy Queen Kid's Meal promotion, which included 5 toys of Garfield and 1 toy of Odie doing various outside activities. The most recent promotion was at Kmart, where 3 toys were sold in the dining area.

Commercials
June 22, 1985 – American Express
May 29, 1986 – McDonald's Stuck on You
January 14, 1987 – Kellogg's
November 19, 1987 – Alpo Cat Food
December 12, 1987 – Kellogg's
1989 – Cadbury Garfield chocolates (Australia)
July 23, 1989 – PURR Cat Food (Canada)
December 13, 1989 – General Mills Fruit Snacks
August 13, 1990 – Garfield Fruit Snacks
December 15, 1990 – Alpo Cat Food
September 30, 1991 – Embassy Suites
March 13, 1994 – Campbell's
Chia Pet

References